Metacha Boniphace Mnata (born 25 November 1998) is a Tanzanian football player. He plays for PoliceTZ.

International
He was selected for Tanzania squad for the 2019 Africa Cup of Nations and made his debut in the last group game against Algeria on 1 July 2019.

References

External links
 
 

1998 births
People from Dodoma
Living people
Tanzanian footballers
Tanzania international footballers
Association football goalkeepers
Azam F.C. players
2019 Africa Cup of Nations players